Rokitnica  is a village in the administrative district of Gmina Stryków, within Zgierz County, Łódź Voivodeship, in central Poland.

References

Rokitnica